Sajjad Bazgir (born February 28, 1994) is an Iranian footballer who plays as a forward for Persian Gulf Pro League club Malavan.

Club career

Esteghlal Mollasani
Bazgir joined Esteghlal Mollasani in October 2020. He made his debut on November 22, 2020, against Rayka Babol.

Malavan
On 3 April 2021, Bazgir signed for Malavan on a six-month contract until the end of the season. At the end of the season, he extended his contract for one season.

References

External links

1994 births
Living people
Iranian footballers
Association football wingers
Azadegan League players
Persian Gulf Pro League players
Malavan players